Nico Santos (born April 7, 1979) is a Filipino actor known for portraying Oliver T'sien in Crazy Rich Asians and sales associate Mateo Liwanag in the NBC series Superstore. On December 10, 2018, Santos was nominated for the Critics' Choice Television Award for Best Supporting Actor in a Comedy Series.

Early life
Santos was born in Manila, Philippines, and moved with his family to the United States when he was sixteen, settling in Gresham, Oregon. He and his brother attended Gresham's Centennial High School, where they were the only two Filipinos in attendance. In his junior year, he attended the Oregon Shakespeare Festival's summer seminar for high school students, where he discovered his love for theater.

Santos attended Southern Oregon University because of its proximity to the Oregon Shakespeare Festival. He studied acting there before transitioning to costume design due to discouraging remarks from his acting teacher. However, he later dropped out when he came out as gay, and his family refused to continue paying for his education.

Career
Santos worked for several years in the costume department as a dresser at the Oregon Shakespeare Festival.

In 2001, he moved to San Francisco where he worked at various luxury retail stores in Union Square for eight years while doing stand-up comedy, often going to open mics right after work. He later moved to Los Angeles in pursuit of a stand-up career, but found it difficult to advance due to comedy club politics.

In 2012, he started appearing regularly on the late night talk show, Chelsea Lately, as a panelist while working concurrently as a restaurant host.

Santos transitioned his focus back to acting in 2014, when he landed a spot in the annual CBS Diversity Showcase. He originally got in as a writer, but did some acting when he substituted for another Asian actor who dropped out.

As a result of the showcase, which is presented to a slew of industry professionals which includes agents and casting directors, he soon found himself being invited to more and more auditions, eventually landing him a role on the NBC comedy television show, Superstore. He premiered as Mateo Liwanag, a gay, undocumented Filipino, often mistaken as Mexican, retail store associate, on Superstore in Fall 2015.

Santos performed at the Bridgetown Comedy Festival in 2017.

He had a supporting role in the 2018 romantic comedy Crazy Rich Asians, directed by Jon M. Chu.

Santos appeared in the Off-Broadway play, Happy Talk, in spring of 2019. It is written by Jesse Eisenberg and directed by Scott Elliott.

In June 2022, Santos was revealed to have been cast in Guardians of the Galaxy Vol. 3.

Personal life
Santos is gay and as of April 2022 is engaged to marry Zeke Smith, who participated on the 33rd - Millennials vs. Gen X and 34th - Game Changers editions of the CBS reality game show Survivor.

The couple met in June 2019 at a gala to mark the 50th anniversary of the Stonewall riots - an event widely considered a watershed moment in the modern LGBTQ rights movement: Queerty named him one of the Pride50 "trailblazing individuals who actively ensure society remains moving towards equality, acceptance and dignity for all queer people".

Santos' parents were both undocumented before becoming citizens. Santos’ mother is supportive of his career and has often attended his open-mic performances.

During the COVID-19 pandemic, Santos revealed that both his mother and stepfather contracted the virus. His stepfather died while his mother recovered.

Filmography

References

External links

Male actors from Oregon
American gay actors
Living people
People from Manila
Filipino emigrants to the United States
American male actors of Filipino descent
Filipino gay actors
People from Gresham, Oregon
Southern Oregon University alumni
American male television actors
LGBT people from Oregon
American LGBT people of Asian descent
1979 births